Charles Messenger may refer to:
Charles A. Messenger (1853– 21 April 1905), British-Australian rower, champion sculler of Victoria, Australia, father of Dally Messenger
Chas Messenger (Charles William Messenger, 1914–2008), British cyclist